Prikro is a town in east-central Ivory Coast. It is a sub-prefecture of and the seat of Prikro Department in Iffou Region, Lacs District. Prikro is also a commune. Bouaké is 50 kilometres to the west.

In 2014, the population of the sub-prefecture of Prikro was 33,242.

Villages
The 25 villages of the sub-prefecture of Prikro and their population in 2014 are:

References

Sub-prefectures of Iffou
Communes of Iffou